Ivanovo-Sobolevo is a rural locality (a village) in Andreyevskoye Rural Settlement, Alexandrovsky District, Vladimir Oblast, Russia. The population was 40 as of 2010. There are 10 streets.

Geography 
Ivanovo-Sobolevo is located 9 km east of Alexandrov (the district's administrative centre) by road. Volodino is the nearest rural locality.

References 

Rural localities in Alexandrovsky District, Vladimir Oblast